In My Eyes may refer to:

 In My Eyes (EP), a 1981 EP by Minor Threat, or the title song
 In My Eyes (album), a 1988 album by American freestyle/dance musician Stevie B
 "In My Eyes" (Stevie B song), a 1988 song from the above album
 "In My Eyes" (John Conlee song), a 1983 single by American country music singer John Conlee
 "In My Eyes" (Lionel Cartwright song), a 1989 single by American country music singer Lionel Cartwright
 In My Eyes (band), an American straight edge band named after the Minor Threat song
 "In My Eyes", a 2013 song by The Afters from the album Life is Beautiful
 "In My Eyes", a 1999 single by Belgian vocal trance band Milk Inc.

See also 
 In Your Eyes (disambiguation)